Joseph Richard Threlfall (5 March 1916 – 1994) was an English footballer who played in the Football League for Bolton Wanderers and Halifax Town.

References

 Sourced from 

English footballers
English Football League players
Bolton Wanderers F.C. players
Halifax Town A.F.C. players
1916 births
1994 deaths
Footballers from Ashton-under-Lyne
Association football defenders